The Law of Ueki is an anime television series directed by Hiroshi Watanabe, animated and produced by Studio Deen. The series is based on the manga series of the same name, by Tsubasa Fukuchi. A total of 51 episodes were broadcast by TV Tokyo. Geneon Entertainment picked up the series and broadcast the English dubbed version.

Episode list

References

Law of Ueki, The